Heraud or Héraud is a surname, and may refer to:

Corinne Heraud, Chief Inspector of the Missile inspection team in Iraq
Edith Heraud (died 1899), English actress, daughter of John Abraham Heraud
Guy Héraud (1920–2003), French politician and lawyer
Javier Heraud (1942–1963), Peruvian poet
John Abraham Heraud (1799–1887), English journalist and poet